The 2014 Nebraska gubernatorial election took place on Tuesday, November 4, 2014 to elect the 40th Governor of Nebraska. Republican Candidate and former COO of TD Ameritrade Pete Ricketts defeated Democratic candidate and former Regent of the University of Nebraska Chuck Hassebrook, receiving 57.2% of the vote to Hassebrook's 39.2% This was the first open seat election, and the first time a Democrat won a county for governor since 1998.

Republican primary
Lieutenant Governor Rick Sheehy first declared his intention to run for Governor in July 2011. Considered to be the "hand-picked" successor to incumbent Governor Dave Heineman, he was endorsed by him. Sheehy was joined in the Republican primary by Speaker of the Nebraska Legislature Mike Flood in November 2012. Flood withdrew from the race less than a month later after his wife was diagnosed with breast cancer.

Sheehy resigned as Lieutenant Governor and withdrew from the race in February 2013 after the Omaha World-Herald discovered that he had made 2,300 phone calls on a state-issued phone, many of them long and at night, to four women, none of whom were his wife. At the end of the month, Flood was reported to be reconsidering his decision with his wife progressing well in her treatment. In July he announced that he would not re-enter the race.

Cattle rancher Charles W. Herbster, who had not formally entered the race but had been campaigning since July, became the third Republican to withdraw when he withdrew on August 23. He cited the health of his wife, who had recently undergone heart surgery.

In September 2013, Omaha businessman Pete Ricketts joined the race. Ricketts, a former chief operating officer of TD Ameritrade and the son of company founder Joe Ricketts, had run unsuccessfully in 2006 for the U.S. Senate seat held by Ben Nelson.

State Senator Charlie Janssen, who had lagged in endorsements and fundraising, withdrew from the race on February 3, 2014. He said: "The way the field was shaping up, I didn't see a clear path to victory." He later declared his candidacy for State Auditor.

In February 2014, state attorney general Jon Bruning announced that he was joining the race.  His entry made him the perceived front-runner, supplanting Ricketts, who had been regarded as the leading contender up to that time.

In the May 13 Republican primary, Ricketts narrowly defeated Bruning, with 26.5% of the vote to Bruning's 25.5%. His 1-point margin of victory made this the closest Republican gubernatorial primary in 92 years, since the 1922 primary in which Charles Randall defeated Adam McMullen by 0.6 points.

Candidates

Declared

 Jon Bruning, Nebraska Attorney General and candidate for the U.S. Senate in 2008 and 2012
 Tom Carlson, state senator
 Mike Foley, Nebraska Auditor of Public Accounts
 Beau McCoy, state senator
 Pete Ricketts, former COO of TD Ameritrade and nominee for the U.S. Senate in 2006
 Bryan Slone, tax attorney and Managing Partner of the Omaha office of Deloitte

Withdrew
 Mike Flood, former Speaker of the Nebraska Legislature
 Charles Herbster, businessman
 Charlie Janssen, state senator (running for State Auditor)
 Rick Sheehy, former Lieutenant Governor

Declined
 Tim Clare, Regent of the University of Nebraska
 Rex Fischer, HDR executive
 Jeff Fortenberry, U.S. Representative
 Lavon Heidemann, Lieutenant Governor
 David Kramer, Republican National Committee member and attorney
 Bob Krist, state senator
 Ben Sasse, President of Midland University (running for the U.S. Senate)
 Don Stenberg, Treasurer of Nebraska, candidate for the U.S. Senate in 1996, 2006 and 2012 and nominee for the U.S. Senate in 2000 (running for re-election)

Endorsements

Polling

Results

Democratic primary

Candidates

Declared
 Chuck Hassebrook, Executive Director of the Center for Rural Affairs, former Regent of the University of Nebraska and candidate for the U.S. Senate in 2012

Withdrew
 Annette Dubas, state senator

Declined
 Chris Beutler, Mayor of Lincoln
 Steve Lathrop, state senator
 Mike Meister, attorney, nominee for Attorney General of Nebraska in 2002 and nominee for Governor in 2010

Endorsements

Results

Libertarian primary

Candidates

Declared
 Mark Elworth, Jr.

Results

Debates

September 1 debate
Chuck Hassebrook and Pete Ricketts sparred over education policy, economics and full-time residency in Lincoln at the Nebraska State Fair. Hassebrook opposed school vouchers for public school students, suggesting that tax dollars should be used to improve public schools. Ricketts countered that a gradual voucher policy would help students while keeping money in public schools. The duo showed stark differences in economic policy, with Hassebrook supporting a minimum wage increase and Ricketts opposing an increased wage. Moderator Mike'l Severe asked both candidates if they would reside in the governor's mansion full-time if elected. Ricketts, who has three children attending school in Omaha, said that he had not made a final decision on the question. Hassebrook stated that Nebraska needs a "full-time governor" and that he would live in Lincoln because "40 hours a week is a vacation."

October 2 debate
The two candidates traded barbs over past positions in a debate sponsored by Nebraska Educational Communications. Hassebrook accused Ricketts of supporting Gov. Dave Heineman's (R) tax proposal in 2013, which would have increased sales tax rates. The Platte Institute, a conservative think-tank created by Ricketts, supported the tax proposal, which ultimately failed to pass in the face of increasing public criticism. Hassebrook argued that Ricketts tried to hide his support for the measure when he decided to run for governor. Ricketts denied support for the bill, noting that he did not agree with every position taken by the institute.

Ricketts countered by bringing up a report co-authored by Hassebrook in 1990 that called for a ban on exports of genetically modified crops. The issue of biotechnology in farming has grown in prominence due to the importance of Nebraska's agricultural sector. Hassebrook responded that he provided little assistance to the authors of the report, and was wrongly credited as a co-author. He also noted that he supported biotechnology research since the early 1990s, when he served on the University of Nebraska Board of Regents.

Debate viewers also saw Hassebrook and Ricketts stake out distinct positions on immigration and the proposed Keystone XL pipeline that would run through Nebraska. Hassebrook advocated for allowing driving licenses for children brought to the country illegally, while Ricketts opposed issuing licenses as a matter of protecting existing laws. Ricketts suggested that the XL Pipeline would bring jobs to the state and securely transport oil across the country, citing problems with rail transportation of oil. Hassebrook opposed the pipeline because he suggested the project would contribute to climate change.
Complete video of debate

General election

Candidates
In Nebraska, gubernatorial nominees select their running mates after the primary elections.

 Pete Ricketts (Republican), former COO of TD Ameritrade and nominee for the U.S. Senate in 2006
 Running mate: Mike Foley, Nebraska Auditor of Public Accounts. Ricketts had initially selected incumbent Lieutenant Governor Lavon Heidemann as his running mate, but Heidemann resigned from office and withdrew from the election on September 9, 2014, after allegations of domestic abuse. Ricketts named Foley as his new running mate within hours and, after some initial confusion as to whether Heidemann's name would still appear on the ballot, Secretary of State John A. Gale confirmed that the switch had been made to ensure "the accurate reflection of candidates on the ballot."
 Chuck Hassebrook (Democratic), Executive Director of the Center for Rural Affairs, former Regent of the University of Nebraska and candidate for the U.S. Senate in 2012
 Running mate: Jane Raybould, businesswoman and Lancaster County Commissioner
 Mark Elworth, Jr. (Libertarian)
 Running mate: Scott Zimmerman

Predictions

Polling

1.  Poll conducted on behalf of Chuck Hassebrook's campaign.
2.  Mark Elworth (Libertarian)

Results

References

External links
 Nebraska gubernatorial election, 2014 at Ballotpedia

Gubernatorial
2014
2014 United States gubernatorial elections
Ricketts family